Paul Armand Girardet (22 May 1859, Versailles - 1915) was a French painter and woodcut artist of Swiss ancestry.

Life and work
He came from a Swiss Huguenot family. His father, Paul Girardet, was a copper engraver. His brothers, Jules, Eugène, Léon and Théodore, as well as his sister, Julia Antonine (1851-1921), also became painters or engravers.

His first drawing lessons came from his father. He then studied with the illustrator and woodcut artist, . He then learned oil painting at the École Nationale Supérieure des Beaux-Arts in Paris, with Alexandre Cabanel. He lived in Neuilly-sur-Seine and, in 1893, married the sculptor Berthe Imer.

After 1898, exhibited at the salon of the Société des Artistes Français. He specialized in color woodcuts; mainly producing views of landscapes and castles, such as the Palace of Versailles. His paintings were primarily genre scenes and landscapes.

Sources 
 Marie Tripet: "Girardet, Paul Armand". In: Carl Brun (Ed.): Schweizerisches Künstler-Lexikon. Vol.1: A–G. Huber & Co., Frauenfeld 1905, pg.586 (Online)
 "Girardet, Paul(-Armand)". In: Ulrich Thieme, Fred. C. Willis (Eds.): Allgemeines Lexikon der Bildenden Künstler von der Antike bis zur Gegenwart, Vol.14: Giddens–Gress. E. A. Seemann, Leipzig 1921, pg.167 (Online)
 René Burnand: L’étonnante histoire des Girardet. Artistes suisses. La Baconnière, Neuchâtel 1940.
 René Burnand: Les Girardet au Locle et dans le monde. La Baconnière, Neuchâtel 1957.

External links 

 

1859 births
1915 deaths
19th-century French painters
Woodcut cutters
Woodcut designers
People from Versailles